The men's cross-country cycling event at the 2016 Summer Olympics in Rio de Janeiro took place at the Mountain Bike Centre on 21 August.

The medals were presented by Denis Oswald, IOC member, Switzerland and Brian Cookson, President of the UCI Management Committee.

Format
The competition began at 12:30 pm with a mass-start. The length of the course was 34.52 km (0.57 km + 7 laps of 4.85 km each).

Schedule
All times are Brasília time

Start list and result

References

Men's cross-country
Cycling at the Summer Olympics – Men's cross-country
2016 in mountain biking
Men's events at the 2016 Summer Olympics